Rafael Fernandes may refer to:

 Rafael Fernandes, Rio Grande do Norte, municipality in Brazil
 Rafael Fernandes (baseball) (born 1986), Brazilian baseball player
 Rafael Fernandes (footballer) (born 2002), Portuguese footballer

See also
 Rafael Fernández (disambiguation)